Burning Patience (Spanish: Ardiente paciencia) is a 2022 Chilean romantic drama film directed by Rodrigo Sepúlveda and written by Guillermo Calderón. It is based on the novel Ardiente paciencia (The Postman) by Antonio Skármeta. It stars Vivianne Dietz and Andrew Bargsted. It is the first Netflix film produced in Chile.

Synopsis 
Set in 1969, it tells the story of Mario, a young fisherman who dreams of being a poet. Determined to fulfill his goal, he becomes the postman of the famous writer Pablo Neruda. In this way, nurtured by his mentor, he will fight to become a writer and conquer Beatriz, his great love.

Cast 
The actors participating in this film are:

  as Mario
  as Beatriz
 Claudio Arredondo as Pablo Neruda
  as Elba
 Amalia Kassai as Clarita
 Rodolfo Pulgar as Cosme
 Pablo Mecaya as Jorge
 Trinidad Gonzáles as Elvira
 Giordano Rossi as Julio

Production 
On November 7, 2021, Netflix announced that it would produce, together with Fabula, a film based on the novel by Antonio Skármeta Ardiente paciencia. Filming began April 4, 2022 in the town of Isla Negra, on the coast of Chile.

Release 
Burning Patience premiered in November 2022 in Mar del Plata, Argentina as part of the Galas section at the Mar del Plata International Film Festival. The film released internationally on December 7, 2022 on Netflix.

References

External links 

 

2022 films
2022 romantic drama films
Chilean romantic drama films
2020s Spanish-language films
2020s Chilean films
Cultural depictions of Pablo Neruda
Films set in Chile
Films shot in Chile
Films set in 1969
Films about fishers
Films about writers
Films about poets
Films based on Chilean novels
Spanish-language Netflix original films